Operation Hammer was a cross-border operation by the Turkish Armed Forces into northern Iraq between 12 May and 7 July 1997 against the Kurdistan Workers' Party (PKK).

The operation's objectives were to destroy PKK units in northern Iraq, to strengthen Massoud Barzani's Kurdistan Democratic Party in its ongoing Civil War with Jalal Talabani's Patriotic Union of Kurdistan in the hope that the KDP would prevent further PKK raids into Turkey, and to counter Iranian influence in the region as Turkey accused Iran of supporting the PKK, and over 2,000 Iranian forces had entered Iraqi Kurdistan that year to aid the PUK.

The operation ended unsuccessfully and it led to another operation, Operation Dawn (1997).

Conflict
Some 30-50,000 Turkish forces entered Iraq on 14 May in response to an appeal by the Kurdistan Democratic Party for support in its offensive against the PKK. On 19 May, the KDP launched a military operation to evacuate all PKK fighters from their capital in Arbil, which turned into a major battle in which 53 KDP and 58 PKK fighters were killed. In response the PKK ordered four suicide bombings from 1 to 11 June which resulted in the death of 55 KDP fighters. By 7 July, when Turkish forces withdrew, over 2,000 PKK and at least 200 KDP forces had been killed.

The operation drew strong condemnation from Iraq, Iran and Syria.

Casualties 

More than 30,000 troops took part in the initial operation. Turkey announced fatalities at a total of 114 personnel, comprising 14 commissioned officers, 4 non-commissioned officers, 75 soldiers and 21 village guards. Turkey announced the injured at a total of 185 personnel, comprising 24 commissioned officers 17 non-commissioned officers, 338 soldiers and 48 village guards. Turkey announced the total number of militants neutralized at a total of 3,145 with 2,730 being killed and 415 being captured live or injured.

Turkey launched another large-scale operation in September known as Operation Dawn.

International reaction
Iran: The Iranian government condemned the invasion "as not only a violation of all international laws but the sovereign rights and territorial integrity of the Iraqi Muslim nation" and denounced Turkish claims of Iranian support for the PKK as "a joint conspiracy by the Turkish military and Israel."

See also
 Operation Steel (1995)

References

External links
 

1997 in Turkey
1997 in Iraq
Conflicts in 1997
Cross-border operations of Turkey into Iraq
History of the Kurdistan Workers' Party